Ana Lucia Ribeiro Caram (born 1 October 1958) is a Brazilian singer, guitarist, and flautist who sings jazz, samba, and bossa nova music. Caram was born in São Paulo to a family versed in musical expression. She graduated from São Paulo University with a degree in musical composition and conducting. A protégé of Antonio Carlos Jobim,  the primary developer of the bossa nova style, Caram's own is a blend of bossa nova and jazz.

Discography
 Ana Caram (Fama, 1987)
 Rio After Dark (Chesky, 1989)
 Amazonia (Chesky, 1990)
 JVC Jazz Festival Live: A Night of Chesky Jazz, Town Hall, New York with Paquito D'Rivera, Tom Harrell, Fred Hersch, Phil Woods (Chesky, 1992)
 The Other Side of Jobim (Chesky, 1992)
 Maracana (Chesky, 1993)
 Bossa Nova (Chesky, 1995)
 Sunflower Time (Mercury, 1996)
 Blue Bossa (Chesky, 2001)
 Hollywood Rio (Chesky, 2004)
Pensava em Você (2018)
Pura Luz (2018)

References

1958 births
Living people
Bossa nova singers
Música Popular Brasileira singers
Brazilian songwriters
Chesky Records artists
20th-century Brazilian women singers
20th-century Brazilian singers
21st-century Brazilian women singers
21st-century Brazilian singers